Marinus Reniers (born 5 August 1947) is a Dutch archer. He competed at the 1980 Summer Olympics, the 1984 Summer Olympics and the 1988 Summer Olympics.

References

1947 births
Living people
Dutch male archers
Olympic archers of the Netherlands
Archers at the 1980 Summer Olympics
Archers at the 1984 Summer Olympics
Archers at the 1988 Summer Olympics
Sportspeople from Eindhoven